Kiribati competed in the 2014 Commonwealth Games in Glasgow, Scotland from 23 July – 3 August 2014.

Due to a scheduling conflict between the Commonwealth Games and the 2014 Micronesian Games in Pohnpei, Kiribati has had to split its delegation between the two events. In Glasgow, the country is represented by 20 athletes in six sports: athletics, badminton, boxing, table tennis, weightlifting and wrestling. Participating in their fifth Commonwealth Games, Kiribati won its first medal, a gold, in men's weightlifting 105 kg by David Katoatau.

Medalists

Athletics

Men
Track & road events

Field Events

Badminton

Boxing

Men

Women

Taoriba Biniati is Kiribati's first female boxer. She represented her country at the age of 18 in the 2014 Commonwealth Games. This was her first ever fight against another woman. She lost on points to Mauritian fighter Isabelle Ratna in the lightweight division.

Table Tennis

Singles

Doubles

Team

Qualification Legend: Q=Main Bracket (medal); qB=Consolation Bracket (non-medal)

Weightlifting

Men

Women

Wrestling

Men's freestyle

References

Nations at the 2014 Commonwealth Games
Kiribati at the Commonwealth Games
Com